The Universidad de San Carlos de Guatemala (USAC, University of San Carlos of Guatemala) is the largest and oldest university of Guatemala; it is also the fourth founded in the Americas. Established in the Kingdom of Guatemala during the Spanish colony, it was the only university in Guatemala until 1954, although it continues to hold distinction as the only public university in the entire country.

The university has had five major transformations:
 Royal and Pontifical University of San Carlos Borromeo (1676–1829): Established during the colony by the Spanish Crown in the 17th century, approved by the Vatican and directed by regular orders of the Catholic Church. After the Independence in 1821, it was called Pontifical University.
 Academia de Ciencias (Academy of Science) (1834–1840): a secular institution created during the Central American Federation by the liberal governor Mariano Galvez.
 Pontifical University of San Carlos Borromeo (1840–1875): an ecclesiastical institution run by the regular orders during the governments of Rafael Carrera and Vicente Cerna y Cerna, ratified by the Concordat of 1854.
 National University of Guatemala' (1875–1944): a secular and positivist institution divided into colleges of Notary and Law, Medicine and Pharmacy.
 University of San Carlos of Guatemala (1944- ): a socially oriented secular institution established after the Revolution of 1944.

The university grew out of the Colegio de Santo Tomás de Aquino (Saint Thomas Aquinas High School), founded in 1562 by Bishop Francisco Marroquín. After a series of major earthquakes in 1773, which destroyed many parts of the city of Santiago de los Caballeros, the crown authorities ordered the evacuation of the city and the relocation of its government, religious and university functions to the new capital La Nueva Guatemala de la Asunción, the  university's present location. In the early years, from the 16th to 19th centuries, it offered studies in civil and liturgical law, theology, philosophy, medicine and indigenous languages.

However, their activities were interrupted after the Independence of Central America in 1821. At that time, each province of the former Captaincy General of Guatemala promoted the creation of a local university. The university remained as an institution in Guatemala, but it closed in 1829, after the conservative criollos were expelled from Central America, and in 1834 converted into the "Academy of Sciences". In 1840, with the comeback of the conservatives, it was turned into the "Pontifical University of San Carlos Borromeo" once again and even for a short period between 1918 and 1920, it was called "Estrada Cabrera University" in honor of the then president, lawyer Manuel Estrada Cabrera. After the Revolution of October 1944, the USAC managed to obtain total autonomy, but from 1954, with the resurgence of Catholic education and the establishment of private universities, an attrition process of the university began, which included constant nonpayment of the budget percentage that corresponds to the university by the Constitution and the persecution and assassination of student leaders and faculty members throughout the duration of the Guatemala Civil War (1960–1996).

History

First era: Royal and Pontifical University of San Carlos Borromeo 

The university tradition in Guatemala and Central America goes back to the 17th century, when the University of San Carlos was founded on 31 January 1676 by Royal Decree of Carlos II in the colonial capital of Santiago de los Caballeros de Guatemala. The Royal University of San Carlos became the third Royal College founded in Spanish America and it was consecrated by Pope Innocent XI on June 18, 1687.

Colonization by the Spaniards implied a new formation of society, with its brand new civil and ecclesiastical institutions. As time went by, residents demanded a place in the royal institutions for their descendants, in return for the heroics of their ancestors during the battles of conquest. However, there were no schools to teach youth to become public servants.

It was not until the second half of the 16th century that the first initiatives to found schools that covered more than religious indoctrination and reading and writing took place. The first bishop of Guatemala, Francisco Marroquín, requested the approval of the Spanish crown to set up a grammar class, in which Latin was to be taught, as it was the intellectual language of the time. This single fact has been the basis to perpetuate the myth that links bishop Marroquin to the early stages of the University of San Carlos.

Towards the end of his life, in 1562, Marroquin left in his will some funds to set up a school, the Santo Tomás de Aquino, where  Grammar, Arts, Philosophy and Theology would be taught. The beneficiaries of this pious enterprise would be the children of poor Spaniards, given that they could not travel to cities (like Mexico) where the Royal Universities were. This will has been also interpreted by scholars as the origin of the University of San Carlos. However, the late priest had a clear idea of the difference between a school (i.e., a home for students, with or without classes) and a university (or General Study) where the students earned degrees. About this, historian John Tate Lanning tells that "his will is so well known that there are some scholars that have not even seen it and have already read a lot of things that are not there at all. Nowhere in his will Marroquín talks about any university, much less talk about his intentions to establish one..." On the other hand, what is documented is that major Pedro Crespo Suárez left in his will twenty thousand pesos to set up the classes for the university that is "in the works with the authorities".

In 1598, the third bishop of Guatemala Gómez Fernández de Córdoba y Santillán, O.S.H., following ecclesiastical directions from the Council of Trent and on the basis of the royal decrees issued after that council, authorized the foundation of the "Nuestra Señora de la Asunción" School and Seminary, which was the first higher educational institution in the Kingdom of Guatemala. The Jesuits, who already had their Colegio de San Borja and wanted to run the seminary themselves, opposed its foundation, as they did not like other regular orders – Mercedarians, Franciscans and Dominicans or the leader of the secular clergy took an initiative in religious and educational matters.

The president of the Real Audiencia authorized that classes should start while they were awaiting the authorization to build the new school for the students; at the time they only had one classroom in the Dominican convent where, in theory, they gave the Arts, Theology and Religion classes. After several decades, discussions and petitions, king Carlos II on 31 January 1676, granted a license to the city of Santiago de los Caballeros de Guatemala to found a university. This would be third royal university in the Spanish Empire in America, and the second in New Spain, after the one in Mexico. After the disputatious process of organization, and five years after the royal decree, the university started officially its lectures of five of the nine classes, on 7 January 1681, with little more of sixty registered students and with its first president, Dr. José de Baños y Soto Mayor, who was in charge of the cathedral, Preacher of the King of Spain and Doctor from the University of Osuna. The university started under the protection of San Carlos Borromeo, with its first directive written by Francisco Saraza y Arce, who copied from those of the University of México which, in turn, were adapted from the Universidad de Salamanca in Spain.

First graduates and science teaching 

In 1660 the printer :es:José de Pineda Ibarra arrived at Santiago de los Caballeros. Among all his works he introduced university graduation cards, where it was written what the final exam was going to be about, date and time for the exam, and the names of the university authorities and student sponsors.

On 11 July 1717, thirty years after its papal sanction, the first medicine student graduated; his name was Vicente Ferrer González. The next physician to graduate was Pedro Palacios y Cóbar, who presented his final exam seventeen years later; and forty-seven years after that, the eminent Dr. José Felipe Flores graduated.

The Franciscan friar Juan Antonio Liendo y Goicoechea reformed university education towards the end of the 18th century by introducing science; Chemistry, Physics, Anatomy and Mathematics; and technology studies.

Second era: Science Academy 

After Independence, the University of San Carlos lost its Royal status and became simply the "Pontifical University of San Carlos Borromeo" but it was in a precarious position: after the move from Santiago de los Caballeros it had to use a borrowed building to teach, and in 1821 its new one was not finished yet; besides, the political climate of the region was very unstable at the time. In 1825, Dr. Juan José de Aycinena y Piñol was elected as president of the university, and kept the religious curriculum that the institution had had for decades. However, in 1829, the conservative regime of his brother Mariano de Aycinena y Piñol was defeated by the liberal general Francisco Morazán, and the conservatives – mainly the Aycinena family – and the regular clergy were expelled from Central America and the university was suspended. In 1834, when doctor Mariano Gálvez was head of State of Guatemala, he found the Science Academy in the State, which took the position that the Pontifical University had previously occupied; the new university eliminated religious education altogether and implemented classes of Algebra, Geometry, Trigonometry and Physics; besides, the institution began to offer studies in engineering. The Academy of Science was open until 1840, because in that year the conservatives regained power in Guatemala under the strong leadership of General Rafael Carrera who reopened the old "Pontifical University of San Carlos Borromeo"; Dr. Aycinena was once again named as president of the university.

Third era: Pontifical University 

The power that the Catholic Church and the Aycinena family – to whom most of Carrera's advisors and secretaries belonged – had during the conservative regime in Guatemala was ratified the Concordat of 1854, in which Guatemala entrusted the education of its people to the regular clergy of the Catholic Church, committed itself to respect all church property -including haciendas, monasteries and sugar mills, authorized mandatory tithing and let the bishops censor all the country's publications; in return, Guatemala obtained indulgences for Army members, was allowed to keep all those properties that had been taken from the orders in 1829 – provided they were now in private hands, received a tax of the church income and had the right to prosecute any priest or bishop under Guatemalan law, if necessary. The concordat was designed by Juan José de Aycinena y Piñol, who was a cabinet member of the government – besides being the university president; then, it was first ratified by Secretary of the Interior, Justice and Ecclesiastical affairs Pedro de Aycinena and finally, approved by president Rafael Carrera, who in 1854 was appointed as Guatemala's president for life.

Fourth era: The university during the Liberal regimes

After the Liberal Revolution in 1871, the conservatives defeat resulted in a complete change of direction in the education in Guatemala:  once again the regular clergy was expelled from the country, and all of their properties we confiscated. The education changed from completely religious to agnostic and kept like that until 1954.

The new Liberal regime founded the Polytechnic School -Military Academy- in 1873 to prepare military engineers, topographers and telegraphers, besides military officers. In July 1875, Justo Rufino Barrios closed the Pontifical University of San Carlos Borromeo and in its place founded the Central College of Law and the Central College of Medicine and Pharmacy which formed the National University of Guatemala.  The government decreed that the teaching of Medicine had to be practical – as much as possible – and philosophical, with all the modern scientific theories. In 1877, the government found the Western College of Law in Quetzaltenango and in 1879 founded the National Library.
 Finally, in 1879 president Barrios founded the Colleges of Engineering, Philosophy and Literature.

President general Manuel Lisandro Barillas Bercián (1885–1892) founded the Western College of Medicine in Quetzaltenango and granted scholarship to the best students to continue their education abroad, both from Guatemala and Quetzaltenango.

On 21 March 1893, during the government of general José María Reina Barrios, decree #193 of the National Assembly established that all the board of directors members, deans and faculty of the National University colleges would be appointed by the President of Guatemala; thus the colleges lost the autonomy to select their own authorities.

In 1897, after the failure of the Exposición Centroamericana and the deep economic crisis that ensued, Reina Barrios implemented austerity measures that included closing the schools and university colleges. At the end of that year, Salvador Mendieta came back to Guatemala to attend the university, but due to the political stability of the times after the revolts against Reina Barrios both in the Eastern and Western regions of the country once it was known that Reina Barrios had extended his presidential term, and the closing of the university, decided to move to México in early 1898. However, after the assassination of president Reina Barrios on 8 February, the Guatemalan government reopened the educational institutions, claiming that they were the basis for all the Liberal institutions;  Mendieta, then, registered to begin that semester in the College of Law of the National University.

Estrada Cabrera presidency

Nicaraguan citizen Salvador Mendieta, who had already been expelled once from the Central National Institute for Boys by the former president José María Reyna Barrios for attempting to form a student association aimed at criticizing the school principal, founded on 18 June 1899 along with other fellow students "El Derecho" student association.  The new association had members from the colleges of Law, Engineering and Medicine and an ideology identified with the Central American union. The new society became public on 15 September 1899 when the Guatemala City mayor invited some of its members to ceremonies for the Independence of Central America celebration that took place in the College of Law.

This society had several humanistic and social goals:
 gather all the Central American students around the idea of the region unity
 tighten social relationships and encourage intellectual sharing
 promote the formation of similar societies all across Central America
 organize the fight between those who think and those who oppress.

Due to the strong accusations against his presidency, Estrada Cabrera closed "El Derecho" after only a year of its life, and they had Mendieta sent to prison after which he sent the Nicaraguan into exile for promoting rebellion against his government.

In April 1899, the National Assembly submitted Estrada Cabrera a decree declaring the autonomy of the university colleges to elect their own authorities; the president vetoed the decree indicating that "the colleges could not be autonomous given that they were dependent on the State in all senses [...]" Therefore, the different colleges remain as dependencies of the Secretary of Public Education, which submitted a yearly review of their status, and also recommended the president whom to choose as dean and faculty members. Also, by a decree published on 16 June 1900, Estrada Cabrera militarized all the male student centers, including the university colleges, who received military instruction for the six first months of their careers.

By 1907, the colleges were:

 College of Law (seventy students)
 College of Medicine and Pharmacy (150 students)
 Dentistry institute (5 students)
 School of midwives (10 students)
 School of Engineering (15 students)

Note that in 1907, the school of Engineering was part of the National University. This school, due to budget reasons, was alternatively part of the National University and the military academy; finally in 1908, the school was left as part of the university for good, after president Estrada Cabrera closed the academy following a failed assassination attempt that the cadets had plotted against him.

In 1918, the servility towards the presidents was at its peak and the university was renamed "University of Guatemala, Estrada Cabrera", by decree of the National Assembly on 2 May 1918. Francisco Galvez Portocarrero, close friend of the president, lobbied heavily for the new university given that in a recent trip to Perú], Argentina and Chile, he liked the model the universities followed in those South American countries. Upon returning to Guatemala, Galvez – who was also a National Assembly representative- brought along a complete library about universities and convinced both the president and the Assembly members to create the "University of Guatemala".

Carlos Herrera presidency (1920–1921) 

University "Estrada Cabrera", was closed after the falling of the former president. However, one of the first decrees of the new president Carlos Herrera y Luna -appointed president by the National Assembly on 8 April- was to appoint new authorities and faculty for the National University, which now had the following academic departments:

 College of Natural Science and Pharmacy
 College of Law
 College of Medicine
 College of engineering

Herrera y Luna, as a token of appreciation of all the efforts of the university students during the last days of Estrada Cabrera regime, gave the different colleges their autonomy to elected their own authorities, although it did not grant them full autonomy.  At this time the Student Body Association was founded and included Miguel Angel Asturias, among a series of other Guatemalan intellectuals, and the second era of "El Derecho" Law student association, which had been closed by Estrada Cabrera in 1899.

Fifth era: the university after the 1944 Revolution 

After the revolution against general Ubico's successor, general Federico Ponce Vaides, on 20 October 1944, the new government granted its complete autonomy to the university; Decree #12 on 11 November 1944 granted autonomy and renamed the institution as "Universidad de San Carlos de Guatemala" ("University of San Carlos of Guatemala"). The university's new role was to be director of college education in Guatemala, and to cooperated in study and solution of the critical problems that Guatemala faced at the time.

New colleges were created that time:

 College of Human Studies: created by then president Dr. Juan José Arévalo on 17 September 1945. Among its founder were Dr. Eduardo García Máynez -professor emeritus of the Universidad Nacional Autónoma de México- as honorary faculty. The college studied: Philosophy, History, Literature, Psychology and Pedagogy.
 College of Agriculture
 College of Architecture
 College of Economics

Likewise, access was granted to both women and to all the society members that had been excluded from the institution in the past.

After 1954 coup d'état 

Following its constitutional mandate, the university became involved in the political life of the country, presenting concrete social, economic and political proposals.  However, with the beginning of the Cold War between the United States and the Soviet Union -major super powers that split world dominance after their victory in World War II, the 1954 Guatemalan coup d'état, the Cuban Revolution in 1959 and the influx of students from all over the social spectrum in Guatemala, Marxism became radical in the university. Besides, then archbishop of Guatemala Mariano Rossell y Arellano found out that it was urgent to recover some of the former influence Catholic Church used to have, and that it lost during the liberal regime of Justo Rufino Barrios in 1872, and therefore decided to work with the United Fruit Company to get rid of the Revolutionary governments whom he accused of atheist and communist. On 4 April 1954, Rossell y Arellano issued an open letter in which he denounced Communism advances in the country, and begged Guatemalans to rise in arms and fight against the common enemy of God and the Land. His letter has published all over Guatemala, and even though he kept claiming that the Catholic Church was not seeking privileges in its anticommunist quest, Rossel y Arellano was able that after the 1954 coup, new president colonel Carlos Castillo Armas included the following back in the new Constitution of Guatemala, for the first time since 1872:
 that the Catholic Church had the right to own real estate and other properties
 that religious education was declared of public interest
 that the State supported religious education
 that there were independent private universities not connected with University of San Carlos.

This way, the Catholic Church recover some of the former power it held before 1871, when the Liberal Reform confiscated its properties and cancelled its privileges, in a direct attack against it as the main conservative party member of the time.

Nottebohm case and the Dean of the College of Law 

Between 1951 and 1955, College of Law dean, Dr. Adolfo Molina Orantes, worked as a legal advisor for the Guatemalan delegation before the International Court of Justice of The Hague for the Nottebohm case (Liechtenstein v. Guatemala) [1955].  The case about Mr. Nottebohm, who was born 16 September 16, 1881, in Hamburg, Germany and possessed German citizenship although he lived in Guatemala from 1905 until 1943 because he never became a citizen of Guatemala. On October 9, 1939, Nottebohm applied to become a naturalized citizen of Liechtenstein. The application was approved and he became a citizen of that country. He then returned to Guatemala on his Liechtenstein passport and informed the local government of his change of nationality. When he tried to return to Guatemala once again in 1943 he was refused entry as an enemy alien since the Guatemalan authorities did not recognize his naturalization and regarded him as still German. It has been suggested that the timing of the event was due to the recent entry of the United States and Guatemala into the Second World War. He was later extradited to the United States, where he was held at an internment camp until the end of the war. All his possessions in Guatemala were confiscated. After his release, he lived out the rest of his life in Liechtenstein.

The Government of Liechtenstein granted Nottebohm protection against unjust treatment by the government of Guatemala and petitioned the International Court of Justice. However, the government of Guatemala argued that Nottebohm did not gain Liechtenstein citizenship for the purposes of international law. The court agreed and thus stopped the case from continuing.

The Nottebohm case was subsequently cited in many definitions of nationality. and Dr. Molina Orantes was recognized as an expert in international Law and named permanent consultant of the International Court.

Private universities 

As a result of the political climate changes after the coup of 1954, the society elites decided to create their own private universities, which would have very different ideologies from the ones presented in the University of San Carlos.  Basically the new institutions would have capitalist and liberal ideologies while the national university chose Marxism.  After heavy lobbying, in 1965 the new ISR tax law exonerated potential private universities from any kind of taxation and state contributions, and in 1966 the Law of Private Universities was approved.

Research on Guatemalan history 

In 1957 the highly regarded Marxist historian :es:Severo Martínez Peláez return to Guatemala after his exile and joined the university as a faculty member. The College of Economics dean, Rafael Piedrasanta Arandi, and the university president, Edmundo Vásquez Martínez, approved a scholarship for Martinez Pelaez to research the Archivo General de Indias in Sevilla, Spain between 1967 and 1969. From this research comes his main work, La patria del criollo, published in 1970, as well as the program of Economic History of Central America of the College of Economics and the total reform of the School of History in 1978.

In 1979, due to death threats from the general Fernando Romeo Lucas García regime, Martínez Peláez had to go into exile once again with his family and continued with his research and teaching activities in the Benemérita Universidad Autónoma de Puebla in Mexico, where he was an invited speaker in several seminars and created new curricula for the College of History.  Besides, he had important meetings with historians and Guatemalan exiles in Mexico.

Veterinary medicine 

The College of Veterinary was created on 27 September 1957, and initially was part of the College of Medicine and was located in the old Medicine Building in Guatemala City Historical Downtown. In 1958 and 1959 it moved into private homes that the university rented  in zones 9 and 4 of Guatemala City;  it also used the university's Botanic Garden library in zone 4. By 1960, the College of Veterinary moved into its definite home in the main University campus.

On 11 January 1969 the School of Animal Studies, which was independent of the School of Veterinary medicine. and on 27 September 1974 it moved into the new modular buildings on the southwest section of the main campus, next to the Veterinary Medicine Hospital.

Repression and decline 

During general Miguel Ydígoras Fuentes presidency, the university started suffering repression due to its position alongside the main labor unions, with three students murdered in front of the College of Law in 1962.

The EXMIBAL Case
During the government of Julio César Méndez Montenegro the possibility of giving the nickel mines in Izabal in concession to a Canadian mining company was brought to the table, but it did not materialized. As soon as the general Carlos Arana Osorio took office on 1 July 1970, he reopened the case and began working in for EXMIBAL to get a concession. However, many social sectors opposed to it, arguing that it would be too costly for the country. One of the main opponents was the commission that the University of San Carlos created to discuss the matter; among the members of the commission was the lawyer Oscar Adolfo Mijangos López, then representative in the Congress, the respected Guatemalan intellectual Alfonso Bauer Paiz -who had been part of the staff of presidents Juan José Arévalo Bermejo and Jacobo Arbenz Guzman, and Julio Carney Herrera  Both Camey Herrera and Bauer Paiz were shot in November 1970: Carney died of his wounds while Bauer Paz, severely wounded, had to go into exile.

The commission members had strongly opposed the conditions proposed by the Government to grant the concession EXMIBAL; after the attack against Bauer Paiz and Carney, on 13 February 1971 Mijangos López was assassinated by unknown assailants as he left his office long the 4th Avenue in Zone 1 of the Guatemala City. Mijangos Lopez had been under the fatal impression that the government was not going to assassinate him because he was on a wheelchair since 1958.

On 8 May 1971, Arana Osorio's administration finally granted the concession to EXMIBAL; it covered 385 square kilometers in the area of El Estor, with and initial investment of US$228 million. The mine, built in the mountains of indigenous maya Q'eqchi people, included a residential complex of 700 homes, numerous offices, a hospital, a small shopping center, school, a golf course and a large area for industrial processing.

Laugerud and Lucas García military governments

During the military governments of the seventies, the tension between the government and the university kept growing, until it reached its peak in 1978 during the massive demonstration that occurred to protest rising urban public transportation costs. The Association of University Students (AEU) had a leading role in the protests, but this brought persecution of their leaders and the murder of the secretary general of the association Oliverio Castañeda de León, on 20 October of that year.  Just fifteen days after the murder of Castañeda de León, was missing his successor, Antonio Ciani García, and over the next 18 months almost every student leader and university faculty with political connections were threatened (even with the legal parties). Whoever did not paid attention and continued with their protest activities, was simply killed or kidnapped.

In early 1979, the following attacks occurred against renowned members of the university:
 On 25 January 1979,  Alberto Fuentes Mohr, Doctor of Economics, Congress representative, leader of the Social Democratic Party (PSD) and former minister of Finance and Foreign Affairs during the administration of Julio César Méndez Montenegro, was murdered.
 That same day, but a few hours later, was shot and killed the student and union leader Ricardo Martinez Solorzano.
 On 14 February, Manuel Lisandro Andrade Roca, general secretary of the university in the tenure of Saúl Osorio Paz as university president -and a student leader during the "Marches of 1962"- was killed.
 On 22 March, former Guatemala City mayor Manuel Colom Argueta was killed, in an operation in which his murderers allegedly used a helicopter to direct the operation  Colom had been director of Center for Urban and Regional Studies (CEUR) of the University of San Carlos of Guatemala and a political leader of the United Revolutionary Front (FUR). Next to Fuentes Mohr, he was the most prominent members of the legal political opposition and their deaths ended, even more, the political space in Guatemala. These murders and threats against leaders of the FUR and the PSD continued in 1979 and 1980, and in subsequent years against the Guatemalan Christian Democracy party.
At the university, university president Saúl Osorio Paz, after attacks on his colleagues and death threats against him, began to live in presidency, protected by student brigades of the communist FRENTE student party. In an unprecedented case, the president directed the university from underground for almost two years.

The effect of state repression was worse on the student movement: the AEU ended decimated. Despite all this, the association continued to be a belligerent organization during this campaign of terror. To protect themselves, the AEU restructured its organizational form such that their leaders were not so vulnerable, and declined to reveal their names.

In January 1979, a new freshmen generation arrived to the university. Many of them had been members of the CEEM or student associations in the public institutes and had participated in the events of October 1978. It was them who took the leadership of the AEU. But it was much more difficult to replace the fallen or exiled faculty, which resulted in a marked decline in the academic quality of the institution. Later, laws that severely restricted the university autonomy were proposed, and violating the constitutional mandate to give 5% of the national budget to the institution became commonplace for the government.

Burning the Spain Embassy in Guatemala 

On 31 January 1980, several students from the University of San Carlos advised a k'iche' peasant group who wanted to let the world know about their precarious situation; when  the country's newspapers did not dare to publish their demands, and after all legal avenues to be heard had been exhausted, the group decided to take the premises of the Embassy of Spain and use it as a platform for their demands. The reaction of the government of general Fernando Romeo Lucas Garcia was strong and direct: police surrounded the premises of the embassy and after several hours of siege, the situation ended with the burning of the room where all the people who were inside the embassy had taken refuge, including almost the entire Embassy staff and some random visitors, including former vice president of Guatemala, Eduardo Cáceres Lehnhoff and former Foreign Affairs Minister, Adolfo Molina Orantes. The only two survivors were Ambassador Máximo Cajal López and peasant Gregorio Yuja Xona, who were taken to the Private Hospital Herrera Llerandi. Yuja was kidnapped there and a group tried to kidnap the ambassador, but he was taken from the hospital just in time by the ambassador of Costa Rica in Guatemala; Cajal left the country that night. Yuja, meanwhile, was tortured and his body thrown off the premises of the president mansion at the University of San Carlos. His body was buried in the Heroes and Martyrs Plaza on Central Campus.

1985 civil unrest: military invasion of Central Campus 

During the government of general Óscar Humberto Mejía Victores, the Mutual Support Group (GAM) -led by Nineth Montenegro- was founded and the High School Student Coordination Group (CEEM) also gained considerable strength. The latter was formed by students from the Central National Institute for Boys, the Central Normal Institute for Young Ladies Belén and Rafael Aqueche  which organized mass protests in September 1985 against the rising prices for public transportation. At least ten people died in Guatemala City in the most extensive wave of urban unrest since protests against the government of Fernando Romeo Lucas Garcia in August 1978. The unrest began with demonstrations against rising prices public transportation but then became widespread due to the bad economic situation the country was in at the time. Burning of buses, blockades and massive protests that resulted in destruction of public infrastructure occurred almost every day. The government responded with three thousand Army soldiers, whom supported by light armored forces and the riot squad of the National Police, were deployed in central and peripheral areas of the city. Also, the night of 3 September 1985 the University of San Carlos of Guatemala was occupied by the military who allegedly found an underground shooting range subversive propaganda.

Several hundred people were arrested and General Mejia Víctores addressed the nation through a television and radio address in which he announced measures to address prevailing social unrest. General Mejia announced public schools closure until further notice and the freezing of prices of consumer goods; in the end, as part of the process solution a high school student bonus was granted to both elementary and high schools so they could be transported free in public transportation, plus all the public school students were promoted by decree. Students who graduated by decree in 1985 were received with brutal initiations by the different student bodies through the university.

Constitution of 1985: Election of judges and university representatives before government institutions

After the murder or forced exile of most of its faculty, the stability of the College of Law after the Guatemalan Civil War was recovered with deanship of Cipriano Soto Tobar, who took office in 1988. Soto Tobar took a significant effort on hiring faculty. However, his main goal was to establish political networks to favor political lobbies exploiting the new role that the Constitution assigned to the University of San Carlos: which, enacted in 1985, entrusted the College of Law and the University of San Carlos with the task of naming representatives to the process of election of judges of the highest courts of the land, as well as the Comptroller General of Accounts, and the Chief Public Prosecutor  Also, the university was given the power to send a judge to the Constitutionality Court.

These networks took hold and strengthened through the 1990s, with relationships set up between institutions and societal sectors beyond the university. After leaving the deanship, the University Council nominated Soto to the Constitutionality Court, although there were persistent rumors that he was selling diplomas and certificates. However, his application was accepted because his involvement in these felonies could not be proved because no credible evidence was presented. Two of his performances in the Constitutionality Court showed possible political compromise: first, he voted to validate an illegal adoption network and, then he voted in favor of the registration as a presidential candidate of general Efraín Ríos Montt, despite the prohibition of the 1985 Constitution, which does not allowed as a candidate anybody that had been part of a coup d'état. In those years, adoption networks operating in Guatemala could collect up to US$60,000 per child and went from delivering 1200 children in 1997 to more than four thousand in 2004.

Estuardo Galvez, who took that dean office in 2000 and later went on to become university president, was one of the members of the networks established by Soto; realizing the importance of the Bar Association, which was also a participant in the election of judges -and until then controlled by lawyers linked to the traditional capital of the country- Galvez sought from the beginning of his term to favor his post graduate students placing them in public institutions so that they could show their loyalty with favorable votes in the Bar elections. After several elections, and once Galvez was no longer dean, the network that Soto set up beat the traditional capital lawyers in the Bar Association elections by 300 votes; as recorded in the minutes, the majority of his votes were young lawyers -his former students.

Student leaders murders in 1989

In 1987, the president of the Student Association "El Derecho" (AED), Willy Ligorría, was expelled from the Association of University Students (AEU) for embezzling funds from the Huelga de Dolores Committee, for his direct involvement in an embezzlement money of the association and usurpation of functions and for signing as acting as general secretary in various activities and international documents. After his departure, a series of death threats against members of the board of the AEU began: in 1989 there was a steady escalation of threats, some of them signed by death squads as "the Dolorosa", the "Jaguar of Justice" or "Secret Anticommunist-Army". Despite his expulsion, Ligorría, maintained a very high and combative profile, while his close friend, Marco Tulio Montenegro, was still part of AEU.

In 1989, several student body leaders returned to Guatemala from exile intending to achieve a resurgence of student coordination, which was practically dismantled since the seventies. But on August 21, Iván Ernesto Gonzalez was arrested and kidnapped; the next day, Carlos Contreras Conde, leader of the University Student Movement (MEU), was abducted near the university. That same day Hugo Leonel Gramajo was abducted and introduced in a red pick-up with foreign plates. On 23 August, Victor Hugo Rodriguez Jaramillo and Silvia Azurdia Utrera founders of MEU, were kidnapped and taken violently amid two cars that blocked their way. And Mario De León left a press conference that the Student Body held that day at around 19:45 hours and was detained by the National Police and has not been seen again since. Finally, Aaron Ochoa disappeared the next day.

During an emergency meeting in which the response to the government offensive was being discussed, Willy Ligorría called to say that he knew where Hugo Gramajo and Aaron Ochoa were hidden and that he could bring the still free student leaders to them. In September other members of the student movement, Carlos Chutá Carney, Carlos Humberto Cabrera and Carlos Palencia were kidnapped and found dead shortly afterwards.

After the murders of the student leaders, Ligorría spoke at some rallies in college and participated in the demonstrations that took place.  On Saturday September 15 at 14:15 hours he left for Panamá along with Marco Tulio Montenegro and Byron Milian Vicente. Montenegro returned to Guatemala on 11 November 1989 to rejoin the AEU, but he was already a suspect, and was killed with knife soon after. Meanwhile, Ligorría was appointed head of research of public prosecutions. On September 12, 1997, the Guatemalan National Revolutionary Unity, which became a political party after the peace accords, formally accused Ligorría for his involvement in the murder of the student leader, claiming that he was a member of military intelligence.

University presidents

"Real y Pontificia Universidad de San Carlos Borromeo" presidents

 Dr. José de Baños y Soto Mayor, arcediano de la Catedral, Predicador del Rey de España y Doctor de la Universidad de Osuna
 Antonio de Larrazábal y Arrivillaga(1813, 1820–1825)
 Dr. Juan José de Aycinena y Piñol (1825–1829)

"Academia de Ciencias" presidents
 Dr. Pedro Molina Mazariegos (1836–1840).

"Pontificia Universidad de San Carlos Borromeo" Presidents
 Bishop Juan José de Aycinena y Piñol, (1840–1865)

National University presidents 
 Dr. Agustín Gómez
 Dr. Carlos Federico Mora (1944)

University of San Carlos presidents 

 Dr. Carlos Federico Mora (1944–1945)
 Dr. Carlos Martínez Durán
 Dr. Mario Dary Rivera
 Dr. Edmundo Vásquez Martínez (1966–1970)
 Rafael Cuevas
 Saúl Osorio Paz (-14 de julio 1980)
 Roberto Molina Mejía (14 July 1980 – 31 July 1980)
 Dr. Eduardo Meyer Maldonado
 Roderico Segura
 Alfonso Fuentes Soria
 Jafeth Cabrera
 Efraín Medina
 Dr. Carlos Estuardo Gálvez Barrios
 Dr. Carlos Alvarado Cerezo
 Ing. Murphy Olimpo Paz Recinos
 Pablo Ernesto Oliva Soto
 Walter Mazariegos Biolis

Colleges 

University of San Carlos colleges are structured as follows:

Board of directors 

Each college board of directors is structure with a dean, who runs it, a secretary and five trustees, of whom two are professor representatives, one is a representative of the professional association and two are student representatives.

Dean 

The deans are the directors and representative of their colleges and work on four-year terms.  To be reelected a dean needs 3/5 parts of the electors, a new dean needs half +1.

Academic units 

The university has 40 academic units:
 10 colleges;
 10 schools;
 19 regional centers
 1 Technical Institute

Colleges

Schools

Regional Campuses

Sports
The school's football club Universidad de San Carlos (Guatemalan football club) of the Liga Nacional de Fútbol plays at Estadio Revolución located on campus grounds.

Notable alumni

A list of notable faculty and alumni can be found in List of notable students and faculty of University of San Carlos of Guatemala.

Gallery

See also

 Guatemala Civil War
 History of Guatemala
 List of universities in Guatemala
 List of colonial universities in Latin America

Notes and references

Notes

References

Further reading

 
 
 
 
 
 
 
 
 
 
 
 
 
 
 
 
 
 
 
 
 
 
 
 
 
 
 
 Lanning, John Tate. The Eighteenth-Century Enlightenment in the University of San Carlos de Guatemala. Ithaca: University Press Cornell 1958.

External links

 Official webpage of the Universidad de San Carlos de Guatemala

 
Educational institutions established in the 1670s
1676 establishments in the Spanish Empire
1676 establishments in North America
Guatemalan Revolution
Forestry education
Charles Borromeo